The 2022 Kazakh wildfires are a series of wildfires in Kazakhstan that initially began in Kostanay Region in the beginning of September 2022 and had quickly spread over large swarths of land with about 9,400 hectares being impacted by the night of 3 September.

References 

2022 wildfires
Natural disasters in Kazakhstan
2022 in Kazakhstan
2022 disasters in Kazakhstan